Choristhemis flavoterminata, the yellow-tipped tigertail, is a species of dragonfly from the family Synthemistidae found in New South Wales and Queensland, Australia. Yellow-tipped tigertails prefer a warm, wet climate and often reside near rivers where they also lay their eggs. Specimens of this type of dragonfly are noted in the A.N. Burns Collection in Museum Victoria.

Early life
At hatching, the yellow-tipped tigertail's larvae are about 7.5 mm long, and measure 4.1 mm from each side of the head. The abdomen consists of a small quantity of hair, measures 12.1 mm, and is relatively thin. They are light gray or brown in color, later maturing into a deeper shade of that specific color. Larvae burrow into the mud for protection, but they are endangered by underwater predators capable of digging through the mud burrows from the main body of water, and eating the larvae. Once mature, yellow-tipped tigertail larvae become predators, feeding on smaller bugs.

Body
The average yellow-tipped tigertail has a body length around 47 mm. Its body is long, ending with a bright yellow spot, and its abdomen is thin. Its wings have a slight brown tint and a dark brown rectangular spot. Yellow-tipped tigertails are believed to fake death when frightened by folding their legs across their bodies until they no longer feel threatened, at which point they fly away. They do so most commonly when they are lying on their dorsal or ventral surfaces.

Gallery

See also
 List of Odonata species of Australia

References

Synthemistidae
Odonata of Australia
Insects of Australia
Endemic fauna of Australia
Taxa named by René Martin
Insects described in 1901